Partido Socialista Obrero may refer to:

 Partido Socialista Obrero (es), a political party in 1930s Argentina
 Socialist Workers' Party (Chile)
 Mexican Communist Party